İmranlı, is a town and a district of Sivas Province of Turkey. Population is 6,600 (2005 census). The mayor was Murat Açıl (CHP). The town is located at 108 km to Sivas. It became a district on January 1, 1948, while it was a part of the Zara district.

Demographics 
The town is populated by Sunni Turks and Kurdish Alevis. At least 65 villages in the district are populated by Kurdish Alevis.

Population 
The population of İmranlı district slowly increased to a maximum of 32,253 people between 1950 and 1965. In the 1970s there was a high level of emigration: people left the district because of the lack of social capacities and economic investment, especially towards Western Europe and larger cities in Turkey. Since 2007, the population of the district has been relatively stable, fluctuating between 7,200 and 7,700 inhabitants. The population development of the district is shown in the graph below.

Settlements 
İmranlı district consists of the sole town İmranlı and 102 small villages.

References

Populated places in Sivas Province
Districts of Sivas Province
Kurdish settlements in Turkey